is a one-shot Japanese manga written and illustrated by Fumi Yoshinaga. The series is licensed and published in English in North America by Digital Manga Publishing. The manga is licensed in Taiwan by Sharp Point Press.

Reception
Nora Jemison at aestheticism.com commends the " emotionally-involving" manga. Eduardo M. Chavez at Mania.com felt that the "conclusion was a little contrived". Erin F. at Pop Shock Culture criticises the occasional "non-existent" background but commends the "expressive linework" of the manga.
Diane Gallagher-Hayashi at Library Journal comments on "explicit sexual relationship between a teacher and his young student" should change the rating of the manga from 16+ to 18+.

References

External links

Ed Chavez podcast

1998 manga
Digital Manga Publishing titles
Fumi Yoshinaga
Hakusensha manga
Houbunsha manga
Josei manga
Romance anime and manga
Sharp Point Press titles
Yaoi anime and manga